The Ohio State women's basketball team represents Ohio State University and plays its home games in the Value City Arena at the Jerome Schottenstein Center, which they moved into in 1998.  Prior to 1998, they played at St. John Arena. They have won 14 Big Ten titles (two additional championships have been vacated by the NCAA), which is the most in the conference and have 23 appearances in the NCAA Tournament, the most recent being in 2022 (two other appearances have been vacated). In 1993, they lost to Sheryl Swoopes and the Texas Tech Red Raiders 84–82 for the national title. They captured the NIT title in 2001, beating the New Mexico Lobos 62–61.  Notable alumni include former All-Americans Katie Smith and Jessica Davenport. They're currently coached by Kevin McGuff, who was  previously the head coach at the University of Washington.

Year by year results

|-style="background: #ffffdd;"
| colspan="8" align="center" | Big Ten Conference

  24 games vacated by the NCAA, as well as conference regular season championship (overall record of 28–7, conference record of 15–1). Adjusted record is 18–6 and 8–1 in conference.
  29 games vacated by the NCAA, as well as conference regular season and tournament championships (overall record of 28–7, conference record of 13–3). Adjusted record is 0–6 and 0–3 in conference.
  15 games vacated by the NCAA (overall record of 14–15, conference record of 10–8). Adjusted record is 0–14 and 0–8 in conference.
  McGuff's unofficial record is 219–98 at Ohio State; his adjusted record is 167–95 and 87–55 in conference.

NCAA tournament results

Awards

Consensus All-American selections

First-Team All-Big Ten

Big Ten Player of the Year

See also
2022–23 Ohio State Buckeyes men's basketball team

Notes

External links